Miconia grayana is a species of plant in the family Melastomataceae. It is endemic to Ecuador.  Its natural habitat is subtropical or tropical moist montane forests.

References

Endemic flora of Ecuador
grayana
Vulnerable plants
Taxonomy articles created by Polbot
Taxa named by Alfred Cogniaux